Daniel Sikorski (born 2 November 1987) is an Austrian footballer who plays as a striker for Aris Limassol. Besides Austria, he has played in Germany, Switzerland, Russia, Romania, Cyprus, and Spain.

Club career
Sikorski was born in Warsaw, Poland. After spending his youth career at SV Waidhofen and SKN St. Pölten in Austria, he joined the reserve team of Bayern Munich in 2005. In August 2007, Sikorski trained with the Bayern Munich first-team squad. On 12 March 2010, Sikorski announced that he will leave Bayern Munich at the end of the 2009–10 season.

On 23 June 2010, he signed a two-year contract with Polish Ekstraklasa club Górnik Zabrze. After a successful season in Zabrze, on 8 June 2011 he was signed by his hometown club Polonia Warsaw, where he received a four-year contract. After one season, Sikorski moved to Wisła Kraków.

International career
Sikorski played for Austria U-19, U-20 and U-21 national teams. He represented the country at the 2006 UEFA European Under-19 Football Championship.

Personal life
Sikorski was born in Poland, but shortly afterwards he moved with his parents to Waidhofen an der Thaya, Austria. His father Witold was also a professional footballer, who spent playing eight years for Legia Warsaw and for numerous other clubs in Poland, Sweden and Austria. Sikorski holds both Austrian and Polish citizenship.

Career statistics

References

External links
 
 

Living people
1987 births
Footballers from Warsaw
Association football forwards
Austrian footballers
Austrian expatriate footballers
Polish footballers
Polish emigrants to Austria
FC Bayern Munich II players
Górnik Zabrze players
Polonia Warsaw players
Wisła Kraków players
FC St. Gallen players
SV Ried players
FC Khimki players
CS Gaz Metan Mediaș players
Pafos FC players
Nea Salamis Famagusta FC players
CD Guijuelo footballers
Aris Limassol FC players
Regionalliga players
3. Liga players
Ekstraklasa players
Swiss Super League players
Austrian Football Bundesliga players
Russian First League players
Liga I players
Cypriot First Division players
Cypriot Second Division players
Segunda División B players
Expatriate footballers in Germany
Expatriate footballers in Poland
Expatriate footballers in Switzerland
Expatriate footballers in Romania
Expatriate footballers in Russia
Expatriate footballers in Cyprus
Expatriate footballers in Spain
Austria youth international footballers
Austria under-21 international footballers